Norman Bergamelli (born 21 October 1971) is an Italian former alpine skier who competed in the 1994 Winter Olympics.

The four Bergamelli ski brothers
The Bergamellis were four brothers, Sergio (born 1970), Norman (born 1971), Thomas (born 1973) and Giancarlo (born 1974), and all four were World Cup alpine skiers.

References

External links
 

1971 births
Living people
Italian male alpine skiers
Olympic alpine skiers of Italy
Alpine skiers at the 1994 Winter Olympics
People from Alzano Lombardo
Alpine skiers of Fiamme Gialle
Sportspeople from the Province of Bergamo